Cho Yoon-Hwan (born May 24, 1961) is South Korean football manager and formerly football player.

He played in K-League side Hallelujah FC and 
Yukong Elephants in South Korea.

He was a member of the South Korea national football team. He played at first senior match against Thailand on substitute in President's Cup on June 6, 1983. Cho parted in 1988 AFC Asian Cup and 1990 FIFA World Cup qualification.

Club career statistics

Honours

Club

Player
Yukong Elephants
 K-League (1): 1989

Manager
Jeonbuk Hyundai Motors
 Korean FA Cup (1): 2003

Country
South Korea
AFC Asian Cup Runner-up (1): 1988

Individual
K-League Best XI (1): 1989

References

External links
 
 
 

1961 births
Living people
Association football defenders
South Korean footballers
South Korea international footballers
Jeju United FC players
hallelujah FC players
South Korean football managers
Jeju United FC managers
Jeonbuk Hyundai Motors managers
Becamex Binh Duong FC managers
K League 1 players
1988 AFC Asian Cup players
Sportspeople from Incheon
Expatriate football managers in Vietnam
Expatriate football managers in China